Kodiak Island Borough is a borough in the U.S. state of Alaska. At the 2020 census, the population was 13,101, down from 13,592 in 2010. The borough seat is Kodiak.

Geography
Most of the land area belongs to Kodiak Island, but a thin strip of coastal area on the western part of the Alaska Peninsula and other nearby islands (Afognak Island, Shuyak Island, Marmot Island, Raspberry Island, Little Raspberry Island, Whale Island, Spruce Island, Woody Island, Uganik Island, Sitkalidak Island, Tugidak Island, Sitkinak Island, Chirikof Island, and the Semidi Islands) are also in the borough. The waterway between the island and mainland is known as the Shelikof Strait. South of the island are the open waters of the Pacific Ocean, so the site is considered good for launching certain types of satellites. The Kodiak Launch Complex is ideal for putting satellites in Molniya and polar orbits.

Adjacent boroughs
 Kenai Peninsula Borough, Alaska - north
 Lake and Peninsula Borough, Alaska - northwest

National protected areas

 Alaska Maritime National Wildlife Refuge (parts of Alaska Peninsula and Gulf of Alaska units)
 Barren Islands
 Semidi Wilderness
 Semidi Islands
 Trinity Islands
 Sitkinak Island
 Tugidak Island
 Alaska Peninsula National Wildlife Refuge (part)
 Becharof National Wildlife Refuge (part)
 Becharof Wilderness (part)
 Chugach National Forest (part)
 Katmai National Park and Preserve (part)
 Katmai Wilderness (part)
 Kodiak National Wildlife Refuge

Demographics

As of the census of 2000, there were 13,913 people, 4,424 households, and 3,256 families residing in the borough.  The population density was 2 people per square mile (1/km2).  There were 5,159 housing units at an average density of 1 per square mile (0/km2).  The racial makeup of the borough was 59.69% White, 0.96% Black or African American, 14.58% Native American, 16.04% Asian, 0.79% Pacific Islander, 2.78% from other races, and 5.16% from two or more races.  6.10% of the population were Hispanic or Latino of any race. 13.10% reported speaking Tagalog at home, a language of the Philippines, while 5.28% speak Spanish.

There were 4,424 households, out of which 45.90% had children under the age of 18 living with them, 59.70% were married couples living together, 8.80% had a female householder with no husband present, and 26.40% were non-families. 19.90% of all households were made up of individuals, and 3.70% had someone living alone who was 65 years of age or older.  The average household size was 3.07 and the average family size was 3.52.

In the borough the population was spread out, with 32.40% under the age of 18, 8.30% from 18 to 24, 34.00% from 25 to 44, 20.40% from 45 to 64, and 4.80% who were 65 years of age or older.  The median age was 32 years. For every 100 females, there were 112.40 males.  For every 100 females age 18 and over, there were 117.40 males.

Communities

Cities
Akhiok
Kodiak
Larsen Bay
Old Harbor
Ouzinkie
Port Lions

Census-designated places
Aleneva
Chiniak
Karluk
Kodiak Station
Mill Bay
Womens Bay

Government and Politics

Kodiak Island Borough is strongly Republican, having last voted for a Democrat in 1964.

See also

List of airports in the Kodiak Island Borough

References

External links

Official website
Kodiak Island Public Access Atlas (Alaska DNR)
 Borough map: Alaska Department of Labor

 
1963 establishments in Alaska
Populated places established in 1963